The Manitoba Regiment was an infantry regiment of the Non-Permanent Active Militia of the Canadian Militia (now the Canadian Army). In 1936, the regiment was disbanded as a result of a country wide reorganization of the Canadian Militia.

History 
As a result of the Otter Commission, The Manitoba Regiment was created on 15 March 1920, by incorporating the 27th Battalion, CEF, into the post-WWI Canadian Militia.

The regiment was headquartered in Winnipeg, Manitoba.

On 1 February 1936, The Manitoba Regiment was disbanded along with 13 other regiments as part of the 1936 Canadian Militia reorganization.

Perpetuations 

 27th Battalion (City of Winnipeg), CEF

Battle honours 

 Mount Sorrel
 Somme, 1916, '18
 Flers-Courcelette
 Thiepval
 Ancre Heights
 Arras, 1917, '18
 Vimy, 1917
 Arleux
 Scarpe, 1917, '18
 Hill 70
 Ypres, 1917
 Passchendaele
 Amiens
 Hindenburg Line
 Drocourt-Quéant
 Canal du Nord
 Cambrai, 1918
 Pursuit to Mons
 France and Flanders, 1915–18

Notes and references 

Infantry regiments of Canada
Military units and formations of Manitoba
Military units and formations established in 1920
1920 establishments in Canada
Military units and formations disestablished in 1936
1936 disestablishments in Canada